Stigmaphyllon ecuadorense is a species of plant in the Malpighiaceae family. It is a vine endemic to Ecuador.  Its natural habitat is subtropical or tropical moist lowland forests.

References

ecudorense
Endemic flora of Ecuador
Endangered flora of South America
Taxonomy articles created by Polbot
Taxobox binomials not recognized by IUCN